Dhaka, the capital of Bangladesh has over 750 high rise buildings. The list below indicates the tallest buildings in Dhaka ranking from highest to lowest based on official heights.
Dhaka has 6 buildings rising at least 100 metres (330 ft) in height.

Tallest buildings
This lists ranks buildings in Dhaka based on official height. All the buildings listed below are either completed or topped out and rise at least  from the ground.

* indicates still under construction, but has topped out

Under construction 

This lists buildings that are under construction in Dhaka and are planned to rise at least 25 stories or

Timeline of tallest buildings of Dhaka

See also
 List of tallest buildings in Bangladesh
 List of tallest buildings in Chittagong
 List of tallest buildings in Sylhet
 List of tallest buildings and structures in South Asia
 List of tallest buildings in Asia
 List of tallest buildings in the World
 List of tallest structures in the world

References

External links

 High-rise buildings in Dhaka, Emporis.com

Buildings and structures in Dhaka
Dhaka
Dhaka-related lists
Dhaka